Mian is a parish  in Amieva, a municipality within the province and autonomous community of Asturias, in northern Spain. 

Sames, the capital of Amieva is located in Mian.

The population as of is 300 (INE 2011). The postal code is 33558.

Villages

References

Parishes in Amieva